Clinton O. "Casey" Sander (born July 6, 1956) is an American actor known as the character "Captain" Jimmy Wennick on the short-lived TV series Tucker. His television credits also include Criminal Minds, The Golden Girls, Grace Under Fire, Home Improvement, Malcolm in the Middle, Rules of Engagement, Sons of Anarchy, Mad Men, Silicon Valley, The Newsroom, Buffy the Vampire Slayer Hunter, NCIS,NCIS: Los Angeles and Marvin Marvin, among other shows. He more recently had a recurring role on the TV sitcom The Big Bang Theory as Bernadette's father, Mike, and also appeared in four episodes of The Ranch as Roger Hollister.

Early and personal life
Sander was born in Washington, D.C. His father was an Air Force lieutenant colonel. While attending Nathan Hale High School in Seattle, Washington, as sophomore, he played shortstop on the school's baseball team.
 
In his senior year, he was a 10th round draft pick for the California Angels and was accepted after he graduated from high school in 1973. Though he had turned down football scholarships from Washington and Washington State University, he had an unsuccessful season with the Angels and was eventually released. Sander and Richard Karn attended junior high school and later attended Roosevelt High School in Seattle together and played against each other on the football team.

After being released from the Angels and playing one season for the Seattle Rainiers, he accepted a football scholarship from University of Puget Sound. He considered becoming a sports broadcaster and took up an acting class in hopes it would help his performance. He participated in college plays including Waiting for Godot. After earning a teaching degree, he briefly taught at Curtis Senior High School in University Place, Washington. After quitting, he drove to Los Angeles and worked as a shipyard hand, log-cabin builder, bartender and car dealer to get by before getting an acting agent.

His first significant work was in print advertising including being the "Winston man" for Winston Cigarettes. Sander has a son, Max, and a daughter, Mimi.

In 2020, Sander appeared as a guest on the Studio 60 on the Sunset Strip marathon fundraiser episode of The George Lucas Talk Show.

Selected filmography
Body Double (1984) - Man #2 in 'Holly Does Hollywood'
Moving Violations (1985) - Cop with Joan
Stewardess School (1986) - Dudley
Ratboy (1986) - Stagehand
Dragnet (1987) - Phoney CHP #1
Punchline (1988) - Ernie the Bartender
Spaced Invaders (1990) - Radio Announcer
Golden Girls (1990) - Season 3, Episode 9 - A visit from little Sven
Predator 2 (1990) - Federal Team #1
Wild Orchid II: Two Shades of Blue (1991) - Captain Edwards
16 Blocks (2006) - Capt. Dan Gruber
The Shaggy Dog (2006) - Leader
Penny Dreadful (2006) - Truck Driver
The Comebacks (2007) - Clint
Crazy on the Outside (2010) - Prison Guard
Heaven's Rain (2011) - Captain Larsen
Focus (2015) - Focus - Niente è come sembra

References

External links

Career statistics and player information from Baseball Reference

1956 births
American male film actors
American male television actors
Living people
Male actors from Washington, D.C.
University of Puget Sound alumni